Yunnan Arts University, founded in 1959, is a Chinese Institute located in Kunming, Yunnan Province, China.

References

External links
 Yunnan arts university 
 real 3D map

Universities and colleges in Kunming
Educational institutions established in 1959
1959 establishments in China